P. Rajagopal (5 August 1947 – 18 July 2019) was the founder of the Saravana Bhavan chain of restaurants based in Chennai, India. Born in rural Tamil Nadu into a farming family, and with little education, Rajagopal built a global restaurant chain. In later life, he was convicted for a 2001 murder, and began serving a life sentence in July 2019. Several days after his imprisonment, he had a heart attack and died.

Murder of Santhakumar 
On the advice of an astrologer, he obsessively tried to take Jeevajothi, the daughter of one of his assistant managers, as his third wife, but she was already married and rejected him. He orchestrated multiple threats, beatings, and exorcism against her and her family. In 2001, after one attempted murder, he successfully orchestrated the murder of her husband Santhakumar. Santhakumar was kidnapped and his body was found strangled a few days later in a resort town in the Western Ghats mountain range.

Life sentence for murder
Rajagopal was freed on bail for medical reasons while his case was appealed to the Indian Supreme Court. However, a judgement was passed which upgraded his prison term to a life sentence, upholding a lower court's conviction. He was sentenced to life for the murder.

In 2009, the brand value of the restaurant chain plunged after the founder Rajagopal was sentenced to life imprisonment by the Madras High Court after being convicted of the murder of employee Prince Santhakumar in 2001 and sexual harassment of Santhakumar's wife Jeevajothi.

Supreme Court upholding
On 29 March 2019, the Supreme Court of India upheld Rajagopal's murder conviction and life imprisonment. As per the order of the Supreme Court, he would have to surrender to the authorities by 7 July 2019 and would have to spend the rest of his days in prison. Rajagopal surrendered to the authorities on 9 July 2019. Although his counsel pleaded for an extension of bail on medical grounds, the plea was rejected by the Supreme Court, which ordered the tycoon to "surrender immediately". Rajagopal also sought exemption from surrendering and pleaded that his hospitalisation time be treated as time spent behind bars. The court rejected this.

Early Life
Rajagopal was born in Punnaiyadi, a tiny village in Tuticorin District, Tamil Nadu, India. His father was an onion seller; his mother was a homemaker.

Business
In 1973, he moved to Madras and started a general provisions store in K K Nagar. He opened his first restaurant in 1981. By 2019, he had expanded to 111 restaurants in 22 countries, employing about 5,000 people. He built a temple in his village called Punnai Sri Srinivasaperumal Kovil.

Death
A heart attack struck Rajagopal on 13 July 2019 after he surrendered to serve his life sentence on 9 July 2019. After transferring from Stanley Medical College Hospital to Vijaya Hospital in Chennai, he died of a heart attack on 18 July 2019.

References 

1947 births
2019 deaths
People from Thoothukudi district
Businesspeople from Tamil Nadu
Restaurant founders